Anthony Blair or Tony Blair (born 1953) is a former prime minister of the United Kingdom.
 Premiership of Tony Blair, his premiership

Anthony Blair may also refer to:
Anthony Blair (criminal) (1849–1879), American murderer
J. Anthony Blair (born 1941), Canadian philosopher

See also
Blair (surname)
Tony Blair (disambiguation)